How I Lost the War is a 1947 Italian comedy film directed by Carlo Borghesio and starring Erminio Macario.

Plot
Italy, late 1940s. After being forced to wear military uniforms for most of his life, when the war ends, Leo replaces them with a firefighter's uniform.

Cast 

 Erminio Macario as Leo Bianchetti
 Vera Carmi as  Gemma 
 Nando Bruno as  Checco Tremelloni  
 Carlo Campanini as The German Captain
 Folco Lulli as  American Official
 Fritz Marlat as  Fritz
 Marco Tulli as  German Official
 Piero Lulli as  German Official
 Nunzio Filogamo as Hat Seller
  Gregorio Di Lauro as Soldier
 Veriano Ginesi as Soldier

References

External links

Italian comedy films
1947 comedy films
1947 films
Films directed by Carlo Borghesio
Films scored by Nino Rota
Italian black-and-white films
Lux Film films
1940s Italian films